Obersdorf station is a railway station in the municipality of Obersdorf in the Märkisch-Oderland district of Brandenburg, Germany. It is served by the line .

References

Railway stations in Brandenburg
Buildings and structures in Märkisch-Oderland